The National Society of Film Critics Award for Best Cinematography is an annual award given by National Society of Film Critics to honor the best cinematographer of the year.

English cinematographer Roger Deakins won this award a record four times. Haskell Wexler, Néstor Almendros, Gordon Willis, Philippe Rousselot, and Christopher Doyle each won the award twice.

Winners

1960s

1970s

1980s

1990s

2000s

2010s

2020s

References

Awards for best cinematography
National Society of Film Critics Awards
Awards established in 1967